The Corporation of the City of Sault Ste. Marie, Ontario is run by a city council of 10 Councillors, representing five wards, and a mayor. Prior to the 2018 municipal elections, the Council was made up of 12 councillors, representing six wards, and a mayor.

Mayor

The city's current mayor is Matthew Shoemaker, who was sworn in on November 15, 2022 after succeeding in the Sault Ste. Marie municipal election, 2022.  He succeeded Christian Provenzano who did not seek re-election.

2003-2006
Municipal Elections were held on November 10, 2003 in Sault Ste. Marie and across the province:
 Mayor - John Rowswell 
 Ward 1 — Steve Butland, James Caicco  
 Ward 2 — Terry Sheehan, Jody Curran 
 Ward 3 — Bryan Hayes, Pat Mick 
 Ward 4 — Neil DelBianco, Lou Turco 
 Ward 5 — David Celetti, Debbie Amaroso
 Ward 6 — Jason Collins, Frank Manzo

2006-2010
Council elected in the 2006 municipal election:
 Mayor - John Rowswell
 Ward 1 — Steve Butland, James Caicco
 Ward 2 — Susan Myers, Terry Sheehan
 Ward 3 — Bryan Hayes, Pat Mick
 Ward 4 — Lorena Tridico, Lou Turco
 Ward 5 — David Celetti, Frank Fata
 Ward 6 — Ozzie Grandinetti, Frank Manzo

2010-2014
Council elected in the 2010 municipal election:
 Mayor - Debbie Amaroso
 Ward 1 — Steve Butland, Paul Christian
 Ward 2 — Susan Myers, Terry Sheehan
 Ward 3 — Pat Mick, Brian Watkins
 Ward 4 — Rick Niro, Lou Turco
 Ward 5 — Marchy Bruni, Frank Fata
 Ward 6 — Joe Krmpotich, Frank Manzo

2014–2018
Council elected in the 2014 municipal election:
 Mayor - Christian Provenzano
 Ward 1 — Steve Butland, Paul Christian
 Ward 2 — Susan Myers, Sandra Hollingsworth (elected on February 1, 2016 in a by-election to succeed Terry Sheehan) 
 Ward 3 — Matthew Shoemaker, Judy Hupponen
 Ward 4 — Rick Niro, Lou Turco
 Ward 5 — Marchy Bruni, Frank Fata
 Ward 6 — Joe Krmpotich, Ozzie Grandinetti (appointed in June 2017 to replace Ross Romano)

2018–2022
The 2018-2022 Council is the first term of the Sault Ste. Marie City Council with 10 Councillors representing five wards. The Council was elected in the 2018 municipal election:

 Mayor - Christian Provenzano
 Ward 1 — Paul Christian, Sandra Hollingsworth
 Ward 2 — Luke Dufour, Lisa Vezeau-Allen
 Ward 3 — Donna Hilsinger, Matthew Shoemaker
 Ward 4 — Marchy Bruni, Rick Niro
 Ward 5 — Corey Gardi, Matthew Scott

History
The youngest city councillor in Sault Ste. Marie history is Robert Gernon, who was elected in 1976 in Ward 6 at the age of 25. Gernon served two terms on council.

The oldest city councillor in Sault Ste. Marie's history is Frank Manzo, whose last term ended in 2014, at the age of 87. Manzo is also the longest serving city councillor in Sault Ste. Marie history, serving for a total of 38 years on council.

The council is most famous for a controversial language resolution, passed in 1990, which affirmed that English was the sole working language of the city government. The resolution was subsequently struck down by the courts in 1994.

References

Municipal councils in Ontario
Municipal government of Sault Ste. Marie, Ontario